Kith Meng is a Cambodian businessman sometimes dubbed as "Mr. Rough Stuff". He is the chairman and CEO of The Royal Group which counts among its holdings 45% of J Trust Royal Bank, the mobile phone operator Cellcard and 100% of Royal Railways. Meng also owns 100% stake in Cambodia's television and telecommunications networks CBS, Hydro Power Lower Sesan 2, a 400MW plant, Chailease Royal Leasing and Chailease Royal Finance in partnership with Chailease of Taiwan, Cambodian Broadcasting Corporation and CamGSM. Meng is known for his preference for entering Cambodian companies into joint ventures with international companies.

Early years

Meng is the youngest of three sons of Chinese Cambodian businessman Kith Peng Ike. He led a comfortable life in his hometown in Kandal Province until 1975 when the advent of the Khmer Rouge regime caused major social upheaval. His family were among those targeted by the Khmer Rouge because of their wealth, ethnicity and socio-economic status. The entire family was sent to a labour camp where, upon arrival, Meng and his two brothers were separated from their parents who later died of starvation. During the confusion resulting from the Vietnamese invasion of Kampuchea, Meng escaped with his older brother Sophan Kith to Phnom Penh, from which they then fled for the refugee camps in Thailand. In Thailand, Meng later related, “They put us in a pig farm...we slept with the pigs...we no longer existed; we had no state, nothing." In 1980, Meng and Thieng were found by a family member in a Thai refugee camp and both brothers immigrated to Australia, where they worked and attended school in the nation's capital, Canberra.

Returning from Australia to Cambodia

In 1991, Meng and Thieng returned to Cambodia, where he and his older brother Sophan Kith began selling furniture and office supplies to the UN and operated a Canon copiers franchise before establishing The Royal Group. In 2008, Meng unseated Sok Kong as President of Cambodia's Chamber Of Commerce. He was elected by his fellow Chamber members unopposed for another three-year term in 2011 and again in 2014.  In 2020, Kith Meng and his spouse donated $500,000 to the Cambodian government to fight COVID-19.

Politics 

Commentators have compared Meng to other well-known Asian tycoons including Singapore's Lee Kuan Yew and Thailand's Thaksin Shinawatra. However, Meng has downplayed suggestions he may one day stand for Prime Minister, saying, "leave politics to the politicians". Still, Meng often accompanies Cambodia's Prime Minister Hun Sen abroad to help promote Cambodia's economic interests and is a strong supporter of Hun Sen. Meng carries the honorary title of "Neak Oknha", a title bestowed by the Royal Family on those who make contributions of $1,000,000 or more.

In June 2011, WikiLeaks exposed an American diplomatic cable calling Meng a "relatively young and ruthless gangster". Meng has received particular criticism regarding his land deals and land rights, being accused of using his political connections to forcefully clear questionably acquired real estate of residents and national monuments in order to proceed with development. Meng and his companies have also been the center of controversies regarding environmental issues in Cambodia, most prominently illegal logging in protected areas of the northeast (including Virachey National Park) displacing indigenous villages and destroying rural villages and fishing grounds for hydroelectric projects without compensation or proper environmental assessment reports.

References

External links 
 Royal Group
 Neak Oknha Kith Meng

Businesspeople in telecommunications
Cambodian people of Chinese descent
Living people
Cambodian chief executives
Australian National University alumni
Year of birth missing (living people)
Controversies in Cambodia